John F. Kennedy Stadium is a 12,000-seat lighted stadium located at Central High School in Bridgeport, Connecticut. The stadium is designed for use for football, soccer, lacrosse games and track and field meets.

The stadium was built along with the current high school, which was completed in 1964, and named for the recently assassinated President John F. Kennedy.  In addition to being home to the CHS Hilltoppers, it was home to the University of Bridgeport's football program until it was disbanded in 1975.

The final game of the minor league Atlantic Coast Football League was held at the stadium, when the New England Colonials defeated the Bridgeport Jets by 41–17 in the ACFL championship game. A total of 10,176 fans attended the contest on November 23, 1973—ten years and a day after President Kennedy died, in a stadium named after him.

In recent years, the stadium served as the site of the Eastern Marching Band Association and Musical Arts Conference marching band field show finals in early November. In 2001, the stadium was the host to the first Major League Lacrosse championship weekend.

Lacrosse

See also
 List of memorials to John F. Kennedy

References

Bridgeport Purple Knights football
College football venues
Monuments and memorials to John F. Kennedy in the United States
American football venues in Connecticut
Athletics (track and field) venues in Connecticut
Soccer venues in Connecticut
Lacrosse venues in Connecticut
Sports venues in Bridgeport, Connecticut
1964 establishments in Connecticut